In the Candlelight is a 1914 American silent short drama film directed by Tom Ricketts, starring William Garwood, Vivian Rich, and Charlotte Burton.

Cast
 William Garwood as Ralph, a young art student
 Vivian Rich as Marian, whom he loves
 Charlotte Burton as Nina, a model
 Louise Lester as Ralph's mother
 Harry Edmondson as Ralph's father
 Josephine Ditt as Marian's mother
 Harry von Meter as Marian's father
 Jack Richardson as Bertran, an artist
 Reaves Eason as Louis, an artist

External links

1914 films
1914 drama films
Silent American drama films
American silent short films
American black-and-white films
1914 short films
Films directed by Tom Ricketts
1910s American films